Zimtenga is a town in the Zimtenga Department of Bam Province in northern-central Burkina Faso. It is the capital of the Zimtenga Department and has a population of 1,036.

References

Populated places in the Centre-Nord Region
Bam Province